Snowville is a town in Box Elder County, Utah, United States. The population was 167 at the 2010 census.

Geography

Climate
According to the Köppen Climate Classification system, Snowville has a warm-summer continental climate (Dfb).

Demographics

As of the census of 2000, there were 177 people, 59 households, and 46 families residing in the town. The population density was 115.4 people per square mile (44.7/km2). There were 71 housing units at an average density of 46.3 per square mile (17.9/km2). The racial makeup of the town was 88.70% White, 0.56% Asian, 9.60% from other races, and 1.13% from two or more races. Hispanic or Latino of any race were 19.21% of the population.

There were 59 households, out of which 47.5% had children under the age of 18 living with them, 62.7% were married couples living together, 10.2% had a female householder with no husband present, and 22.0% were non-families. 20.3% of all households were made up of individuals, and 10.2% had someone living alone who was 65 years of age or older. The average household size was 3.00 and the average family size was 3.52.

In the town, the population was spread out, with 29.9% under the age of 18, 15.3% from 18 to 24, 24.3% from 25 to 44, 20.3% from 45 to 64, and 10.2% who were 65 years of age or older. The median age was 28 years. For every 100 females, there were 96.7 males. For every 100 females age 18 and over, there were 96.8 males.

The median income for a household in the town was $24,375, and the median income for a family was $35,750. Males had a median income of $36,250 versus $35,250 for females. The per capita income for the town was $13,604. None of the families and 4.8% of the population were living below the poverty line, including no under eighteens and 54.5% of those over 64.

History 

Curlew Valley, named after the curlew snipe that nests there, extends from Snowville, Utah, to the Idaho towns of Stone and Holbrook. The first recorded settlers were Peter Skene Ogden's large party of trappers that camped on Deep Creek December 27, 1828.

The beginning of Deep Creek is a large spring at Holbrook which runs through the center of the valley and has never varied even in dry years.

The old pioneer trail and the stage line went through their ranch.

The first townsite in the Curlew Valley was Snowville. Settled at the direction of Brigham Young, the community was named in honor of Lorenzo Snow, an apostle who became President of the Church of Jesus Christ of Latter-day Saints from 1898 to 1901.

Cemetery

The Snowville Cemetery is located at 750 North 600 West in Snowville, Utah. The earliest burial was of William O'Donald, who died on May 27, 1869. As of 2004, there are 540 burials on  owned by the town of Snowville. Two unknown soldiers are buried in the cemetery as well as William Robbins, the first settler of the valley and a veteran of the American Civil War. The cemetery's online database is maintained by the Utah History Research Center.

See also

 List of cities and towns in Utah

References

External links

Towns in Box Elder County, Utah
Towns in Utah
Populated places established in 1871
1871 establishments in Utah Territory